Boualem is a given name for males. People named Boualem include:

 Boualem Benmalek (born 1989), Algerian footballer
 Boualem Bensaïd (born 1967), Algerian Islamist
 Boualem Bouferma (born 1976), Algerian footballer
 Boualem Boukacem (born 1957), Algerian artist
 Boualem Khoukhi (born 1990), Algerian footballer
 Boualem Rahoui (born 1948), Algerian athlete
 Boualem Sansal (born 1949), Algerian author

Buildings 
 Hamoud Boualem, Algerian beverage company.

Places
Boualem, El Bayadh
Boualem District

Arabic masculine given names